List of Australian films of 1996 contains a detailed list of films created in Australia in the year 1996.

1996

See also
 1996 in Australia
 1996 in Australian television

References

External links 
 Australian film at the Internet Movie Database

1996
Australian
Films